Zoarville is an unincorporated community in Tuscarawas County, in the U.S. state of Ohio.

History
Zoarville was platted in 1882 under the name Valley City.   Another variant name was Zoarville Station. A post office called Zoar Station was established in 1861, the name was changed to Zoarville in 1914, and the post office closed in 1983.

References

Unincorporated communities in Tuscarawas County, Ohio
Unincorporated communities in Ohio